Utsira is the smallest municipality in Norway. The island municipality is located in northwestern Rogaland county, just off the western coast of Norway. Utsira is part of the traditional district of Haugaland.

The municipality consists of the main island of Utsira as well as several small, uninhabited outlying islands. All of the 206 residents live on the main island of Utsira, where the administrative centre and Utsira Church are located.

The  municipality is the 355th largest by area out of the 356 municipalities in Norway, making it the second smallest municipality in Norway after the nearby island municipality of Kvitsøy. Utsira is the 356th most populous municipality in Norway with a population of 188, making it the smallest municipality in Norway by population.

General information

The municipality of Utsira was established on 1 July 1924 when it was separated from the municipality of Torvastad. Initially, Utsira had 414 residents. The municipal borders have not changed since that time.

Name
The municipality was named after the island of Utsira which makes up the vast majority of the municipality. The Old Norse forms of the island's name was just Síri (nominative) or Síra (genitive). The first element ut  was added in the 16th century (ut means "out" or "offshore";  compare the "Out Skerries" in Shetland).

The inhabitants still call the island Sira (leaving off the ut prefix) and an inhabitant of the municipality is called a sirabu. The meaning of the name Sira is unknown (maybe "strong stream"). (Sira is also the name of the border river between Rogaland and Agder counties.)

The Norwegian language has had several spelling reforms during the 19th and 20th centuries. Before 1875, the name was written "Udsire", from 1875 to 1924 it was spelled "Utsire", and since 1925 it has used the spelling "Utsira".

Coat of arms
The coat of arms, granted on 23 July 1982, represents the light beams emerging from the local Utsira Lighthouse. The lighthouse was founded in 1844 and is one of the main landmarks on the municipality.

Churches
The Church of Norway has one parish within the municipality of Utsira. It is part of the Haugaland prosti (deanery) in the Diocese of Stavanger.

Transportation
The island municipality is only accessible by boat. There are roads on the island. A car ferry operated by Rutebåten Utsira runs four round-trips per day connecting the island to the town of Haugesund on the mainland. The trip takes about 70 minutes each way. There are ferry docks on the north and south side of the island. The northern port is more often used because the southern route takes a little longer; the southern is used if the weather demands. An ambulance helicopter can land at the football field in medical emergencies.

Government
All municipalities in Norway, including Utsira, are responsible for primary education (through 10th grade), outpatient health services, senior citizen services, unemployment and other social services, zoning, economic development, and municipal roads. The municipality is governed by a municipal council of elected representatives, which in turn elect a mayor.  The municipality falls under the Haugaland og Sunnhordland District Court and the Gulating Court of Appeal.

Municipal council
The municipal council of Utsira is made up of 11 representatives that are elected to four year terms. Currently, the party breakdown is as follows:

History
There are remains from the Stone Age on the island. It has been populated since that time. Historically, the island was governed by Torvastad, based on the mainland, but on 1 July 1924 the island was separated and it was established as a separate municipality. At that time, a new municipal council was to be elected. It was intended that the twelve men on the interim council would be elected, but the official list of candidates listed eleven women and a man. This was not known to even the people involved until the day of the election and by then it was too late. Despite a legal challenge the twelve were elected and Aasa Helgesen, the local midwife, was elected the first Mayor of Utsira and the first female mayor in Norway. Helgesen was a successful Mayor until 1928.

In 2004, Norsk Hydro installed a combined wind-hydrogen utility on Utsira. It is a full scale pilot project for energy self-sufficiency for a remote community. In periods when there is surplus wind energy, the excess power will be used for generating hydrogen by electrolysis. The hydrogen is stored, and is available for power generation in periods where there is little wind. Additional to this an energy storing flywheel exists to help out when for a short time more power is needed.

Climate
Utsira has an oceanic climate (Cfb) with short, cool summers and long, chilly winters with lots of rainfall. The island has significant seasonal lag with February–March typically being the coldest months of the year while August is the warmest. The maritime position also renders low diurnal variation in temperature between day and night.

Shipping forecast
Utsira (under the spelling Utsire) gives its name to "North Utsire" and "South Utsire", two of the sea areas of the British Shipping Forecast.

Notable people 
 Aasa Helgesen (1877–1968) a Norwegian midwife and politician. She served as Mayor of Utsira from 1926 to 1928, and was the first female mayor in Norway. She worked as a midwife in Utsira from 1903 to 1942.

Attractions

Birding
Utsira is known as the best birding site in Norway. There have been 317 different species recorded on Utsira, of which 23 are new to Norway.

References

External links

Municipal fact sheet from Statistics Norway 
Municipality web site 
Map
Birding on Utsira 

 
Municipalities of Rogaland
1924 establishments in Norway